Takashi Ito (born February 14, 1990) is a Japanese professional basketball player who  plays for the Akita Northern Happinets of the B.League in Japan. He played college basketball for Aoyama Gakuin University.

Career statistics

Regular season 

|-
| align="left" | 2012-13
| align="left" | Hitachi
|30 ||1 || 6.2 ||.368  || .471 ||.500  || 0.5 || 0.4 || 0.1 ||0.0  || 1.3
|-
| align="left" | 2013-14
| align="left" | Hitachi
|44 ||4 || 11.4 ||.216  || .062 ||.688  || 0.7 || 1.0 || 0.5 ||0.0  || 1.0
|-
| align="left" | 2014-15
| align="left" | Hitachi
|45 ||2 || 9.9 ||.327  || .292 ||.733  || 0.9 || 0.6 || 0.4 ||0.0  || 2.0
|-
| align="left" | 2015-16
| align="left" | Hitachi
|52 ||3 || 16.2 ||.333  || .273 ||.556  || 1.4 || 1.2 || 0.7 ||0.0  || 2.3
|-
| align="left" | 2016-17
| align="left" | Shibuya
|46 ||30 || 24.5 ||.425  || .284 ||.730  || 2.1 || 2.6 || 0.8 ||0.1  || 7.3
|-
| align="left" | 2017-18
| align="left" | Shibuya
|47 ||35 || 21.5 ||.360  || .293 ||.800  || 1.8 || 2.2 || 0.9 ||0.0  || 4.7
|-
| align="left" | 2018-19
| align="left" | Shibuya
|53 ||39 || 18.8 ||.376  || .289 ||.789  || 1.7 || 2.3 || 0.3 ||0.0  || 2.9
|-
| align="left" | 2019-20
| align="left" | Akita
|37 ||25 || 18.9 ||.309  || .185 ||.739  || 1.8 || 3.1 || 0.7 ||0.0  || 2.4
|-
| align="left" | 2020-21
| align="left" | Akita
|36 ||6 || 13.7 ||.394  || .353 ||.733  || 1.6 || 2.4 || 0.9 ||0.0  || 3.5
|-

Playoffs 

|-
|style="text-align:left;"|2012-13
|style="text-align:left;"|Hitachi
| 2 ||  || 10.0 || .400 || .000 || .000 || 1.0 || 0.0 || 0.0 || 0.0 || 2.0
|-
|style="text-align:left;"|2014-15
|style="text-align:left;"|Hitachi
| 5 ||  || 13.0 || .353 || .400 || .000 || 1.4 || 0.6 || 0.4 || 0.0 || 3.2
|-
|style="text-align:left;"|2015-16
|style="text-align:left;"|Hitachi
| 2 ||  || 13.5 || .000 || .000 || .000 || 1.5 || 0.5 || 1.0 || 0.0 || 0.0
|-
|style="text-align:left;"|2016-17
|style="text-align:left;"|Shibuya
| 2 || 0 || 22:38 || .545 || .250 || .000 || 1.0 || 1.5 || 0.5 || 0 || 6.5
|-

Early cup games 

|-
|style="text-align:left;"|2017
|style="text-align:left;"|Shibuya
| 2 || 2 || 14:18 || .833 || .667 || .333 || 1.0 || 1.5 || 1.0 || 0.0 || 6.5
|-
|style="text-align:left;"|2018
|style="text-align:left;"|Shibuya
| 3 || 0 || 20:33 || .214 || .200 || .000 || 0.7 || 2.3 || 2.0 || 0.0 || 2.3
|-
|style="text-align:left;"|2019
|style="text-align:left;"|Akita
| 2 || 1 || 21:51 || .300 || .000 || 1.000 || 2.0 || 6.0 || 2.5 || 0.0 || 4.0
|-

Preseason games

|-
| align="left" |2019
| align="left" | Akita
| 3 || 2 || 18.4 || .273 ||.500  || .500||1.3 || 2.0|| 0.7 || 0.0 ||  2.67
|-

Source: UtsunomiyaToyamaSendai

External links

References

1990 births
Living people
Akita Northern Happinets players
Japanese men's basketball players
Sendai University Meisei High School alumni
Sportspeople from Miyagi Prefecture
Sun Rockers Shibuya players
Guards (basketball)